Junnardeo, formerly known as Jamai, is a city and a municipality in Chhindwara district in the Indian state of Madhya Pradesh, India. Junnardeo is the head office of the Kanhan area of WCL. It has Asia's largest Coal Wash Plant.

Educational Institutions

University/College 

 Government Junnardeo College, Junnardeo
 Vidya Devi Shukla Mahavidyalaya, Junnardeo (VDSM)
 Government Industrial Training Institute, Junnardeo (Govt ITI)

School 

Some famous schools:-
 Shri Nandlal Sood Government Excellence Higher Secondary School, Junnardeo
 Government Kanya Shiksha Parisar, Junnardeo
 Pandit Ravishankar Shukla Higher Secondary School, Junnardeo
 Eklavya Model Residential School, Junnardeo
 Kendriya Vidyalaya, Junnardeo
 Step Forward Public School, Junnardeo
 Gyan Sagar Public School, Junnardeo
 Kanhan Valley School, Dungariya
 Government Higher Secondary School, Hanotiya

Industries

Coal mines

Junnardeo, about 50 km from Chhindwara, is the head office of the Kanhan area of WCL. It has Asia's largest coal wash plant. It has around 15 coal mines in the Kanhan area. It has a big railway coal transportation and its own importance in railways.

Demographics 
 Madhya Pradesh, India census,

Geography 
It has an average elevation of 748 metres (2,454 feet).

Tourism Attractions 

 Patalkot
 Patalkot Sunset Point
 Junnardeo Hills 
 Tamia Hills 
 Junnardeo Pahali Payari
 Hinglaj Mata Mandir
 Lodheshwar Mahadev Mandir

Notable people 

 Mudgal Singh Nanhe Singh, Freedom Fighter

References 

Cities and towns in Chhindwara district